Ziertheim is a municipality in the district of Dillingen in Bavaria in Germany.

See also
Reistingen Abbey

References

Dillingen (district)